Hualien Baseball Stadium is a baseball stadium located in Hualien City, Hualien County, Taiwan. Although it is relatively new compared to some other stadiums, its capacity and location do not allow frequent professional use, even though many baseball players came from this region.

Hualien Stadium is one of the very few stadiums that, instead of the usual outfield grandstand, have a grassed slope around the outfield as the spectators area.

See also
 Chinese Professional Baseball League
 List of stadiums in Taiwan
 Sport in Taiwan

References

Baseball venues in Taiwan
Buildings and structures in Hualien County
Sport in Hualien